Anti-Irish sentiment includes oppression, persecution, discrimination, or hatred of Irish people as an ethnic group or a nation. It can be directed against the island of Ireland in general, or directed against Irish emigrants and their descendants in the Irish diaspora. This sentiment can also be called Hibernophobia.

It is traditionally rooted in the Middle Ages, the Early Modern Age and the Age of Enlightenment and it is also evidenced in Irish immigration to Great Britain, North America, Australia, New Zealand, and South Africa. Anti-Irish sentiment can include social, racial and cultural discrimination in Ireland itself, such as sectarianism or cultural, religious and political conflicts such as the Troubles in Northern Ireland.

Perspective
The most famous example of Anti-Irish sentiment comes from 1190 with the Norman chronicler Giraldus Cambrensis, also known as Gerald of Wales. To justify the Norman invasion of Ireland in line with the goals of Henry II, he wrote disparagingly of the Irish.

Over the centuries, hostility increased towards the Irish, who steadfastly remained Roman Catholic in spite of coercive force by Edward VI and subsequent rulers to convert them to Protestantism. The religious majority of the Irish nation was ruled by a religious minority, leading to perennial social conflict. During the Great Famine in the middle of the 19th century, some evangelical Protestants sought to convert the starving Catholics as part of their relief efforts.

History

Pre-Modern era
Negative English attitudes towards the Gaelic Irish and their culture date as far back as the reign of Henry II of England. In 1155, Pope Adrian IV (himself an Englishman) issued the papal bull called Laudabiliter, that gave Henry permission to conquer Ireland as a means of strengthening the Papacy's control over the Irish Church. Pope Adrian called the Irish a "rude and barbarous" nation. Thus, the Norman invasion of Ireland began in 1169 with the backing of the Papacy. Pope Alexander III, who was Pope at the time of the invasion, ratified the Laudabiliter and gave Henry dominion over Ireland. He likewise called the Irish a "barbarous nation" with "filthy practices".

Gerald of Wales accompanied King Henry's son, John, on his 1185 trip to Ireland. As a result of this he wrote Topographia Hibernica ("Topography of Ireland") and Expugnatio Hibernia ("Conquest of Ireland"), both of which remained in circulation for centuries afterwards. Ireland, in his view, was rich; but the Irish were backward and lazy:

They use their fields mostly for pasture. Little is cultivated and even less is sown. The problem here is not the quality of the soil but rather the lack of industry on the part of those who should cultivate it. This laziness means that the different types of minerals with which hidden veins of the earth are full are neither mined nor exploited in any way. They do not devote themselves to the manufacture of flax or wool, nor to the practice of any mechanical or mercantile act. Dedicated only to leisure and laziness, this is a truly barbarous people. They depend on animals for their livelihood and they live like animals.

Gerald's views were not atypical, and similar views may be found in the writings of William of Malmesbury and William of Newburgh. When it comes to Irish marital and sexual customs Gerald is even more biting: "This is a filthy people, wallowing in vice. They indulge in incest, for example in marrying – or rather debauching – the wives of their dead brothers". Even earlier than this Archbishop Anselm accused the Irish of wife swapping, "exchanging their wives as freely as other men exchange their horses".

One will find these views echoed centuries later in the words of Sir Henry Sidney, twice Lord Deputy of Ireland during the reign of Queen Elizabeth I, and in those of Edmund Tremayne, his secretary. In Tremayne's view the Irish "commit whoredom, hold no wedlock, ravish, steal and commit all abomination without scruple of conscience". In A View of the Present State of Ireland, circulated in 1596 but not published until 1633, the English official and renowned poet Edmund Spenser wrote "They are all papists by profession but in the same so blindingly and brutishly informed that you would rather think them atheists or infidels". In a "Brief Note on Ireland," Spenser argued that "Great force must be the instrument but famine must be the means, for till Ireland be famished it cannot be subdued. . . There can be no conformity of government where is no conformity of religion. . . There can be no sound agreement between two equal contraries viz: the English and Irish".

Anti-Irish sentiments played a role in atrocities perpetrated against the Irish. For instance, in 1305, Piers Bermingham received a financial bonus and accolades in verse after beheading thirty members of the O'Conor clan and sending them to Dublin. In 1317, one Irish chronicler opined that it was just as easy for an Englishman to kill an Irishman or English woman to kill an Irish woman as he would a dog. The Irish were thought of as the most barbarous people in Europe, and such ideas were modified to compare the Scottish Highlands or Gàidhealtachd where traditionally Scottish Gaelic is spoken to medieval Ireland.

Modern period
In the Early Modern period following the advent of Protestantism in Great Britain, Irish Catholics suffered both social and political discrimination for refusing to renounce Catholicism. This discrimination sometimes manifested itself in areas with large Puritan or Presbyterian populations such as the northeastern parts of Ireland, the Central Belt of Scotland, and parts of Canada. Thinly veiled nationalism under the guise of religious conflict has occurred in both the UK and Ireland.

Anti-Irish sentiment is found in works by several 18th-century writers such as the French philosopher Voltaire, who depicted the Catholic Irish as savage and backward, and defended British rule in the country.

19th century

Anti-Irish sentiments in Victorian Britain and 19th century United States manifested themselves the stereotyping of the Irish as violent and alcoholic. Magazines such as Punch portrayed the Irish as having "bestial, ape-like or demonic features and the Irishman, (especially the political radical) was invariably given a long or prognathous jaw, the stigmata to the phrenologists of a lower evolutionary order, degeneracy, or criminality."

After the conclusion of the Napoleonic Wars, a fall in agricultural prices occurred. During the ensuing depression, farmers in southern England were not able to pay their agricultural workers a sustainable wage. There was an excess of labour compounded by the men returning from the wars. In 1829 added to this mix, was an unprecedented influx of migrant Irish workers who were prepared to work for half what their English counterparts were earning. On the Isle of Thanet the local farm labourers rounded up the Irish workers. William Cobbett wrote:

Irish labourers were singled out in particular, for rough treatment by the locals. Farms employing Irish labour were subject to violent threats and incendiarism. There were similar problems in 1830, however eventually the farmers became the target for attacks, rather than the Irish, in the disturbances that became known as the Swing Riots.

Similar to other immigrant populations, they were sometimes accused of cronyism and subjected to misrepresentations of their religious and cultural beliefs.  Irish Catholics were particularly singled out for attack by Protestants. Anti-Catholicism, whether real or imagined, played to the Catholic respect for martyrdom, and was partly based on a fear of a reborn Inquisition whose methods clashed with the "Age of Enlightenment". Irish Catholics were not involved in formulating church dogma, but it became a stick to beat them with. Mostly they stayed with their church as it fostered a sense of community in an otherwise harsh commercial world.

In Liverpool, England, where many Irish immigrants settled following the Great Famine, anti-Irish prejudice was widespread. The sheer numbers of people coming across the Irish sea and settling in the poorer districts of the city led to physical attacks and it became common practice for those with Irish accents or even Irish names to be barred from jobs, public houses and employment opportunities.

In 1836, young Benjamin Disraeli wrote:

In 1882, five people were murdered in the Maamtrasna, on the border between County Mayo and County Galway in Ireland.  Covering the incident, The Spectator wrote the following:

Nineteenth-century Protestant American "Nativist" discrimination against Irish Catholics reached a peak in the mid-1850s when the Know-Nothing Movement tried to oust Catholics from public office.  Henry Winter Davis, an active Know-Nothing, was elected on the new "American Party" ticket to Congress from Maryland. He told Congress that the un-American Irish Catholic immigrants were to blame for the recent election of Democrat James Buchanan as president, stating: The recent election has developed in an aggravated form every evil against which the American party protested. Foreign allies have decided the government of the country -- men naturalized in thousands on the eve of the election. Again in the fierce struggle for supremacy, men have forgotten the ban which the Republic puts on the intrusion of religious influence on the political arena. These influences have brought vast multitudes of foreign-born citizens to the polls, ignorant of American interests, without American feelings, influenced by foreign sympathies, to vote on American affairs; and those votes have, in point of fact, accomplished the present result.

Much of the opposition came from Irish Protestants, as in the 1831 riots in Philadelphia, Pennsylvania.

Protestants of the nineteenth century would use crime statistics to allege that Irish Catholics were over-represented in crime. There were theories that the over-representation was due to a lack of morality stemming from Catholic religious belief, and other theories that Catholics were racially inferior to Anglo-Saxons. A.B. Forwood (1893) of the Liverpool Conservative Party stated, The influx of the Irish into Liverpool brought poverty, disease, dirt and misery; drunkenness and crime, in addition to a disturbance of the labour market, the cost to ratepayers of an enormous sum of money.

During the 1830s in the U.S., riots for control of job sites broke out in rural areas among rival labour teams from different parts of Ireland, and between Irish and local American work teams competing for construction jobs.

Irish Catholics were isolated and marginalized by Protestant society, but the Irish gained control of the Catholic Church from English, French and Germans. Intermarriage between Catholics and Protestants was strongly discouraged by both Protestant ministers and Catholic priests.  Catholics, led by the Irish, built a network of parochial schools and colleges, as well as orphanages and hospitals, typically using nuns as an inexpensive work force.  They thereby avoided public institutions mostly controlled by Protestants.

The Irish used their base in Tammany Hall (the Democratic Party machine in New York City) to play a role in the New York State legislature.  Young Theodore Roosevelt was their chief Republican opponent, and he wrote in his diary that:
There are some twenty five Irish Democrats in the house.... They are a stupid, sodden and vicious lot, most of them being equally deficient in brains and virtue. Three or four however...seem to be pretty good men, and among the best members of the house are two Republican farmers named O'neil and Sheehy, the grandsons of Irish immigrants. But the average catholic Irishman of first-generation as represented in this Assembly, is a low, venal, corrupt and unintelligent brute.

"No Irish need apply"

After 1860, many Irish sang songs about signs and notices reading Help wanted – no Irish need apply or similar. The 1862 protest song "No Irish Need Apply", written and performed by Mrs F. R. Phillips, was inspired by such signs in London. Later Irish Americans adapted the lyrics and the songs to reflect the discrimination they felt in America.

Historians have debated the issue of anti-Irish job discrimination in the United States. Some insist that the "No Irish need apply" (or "NINA") signs were common, but others, such as Richard J. Jensen, argue that anti-Irish job discrimination was not a significant factor in the United States, and these signs and print advertisements were posted by the limited number of early 19th-century English immigrants to the United States who shared the prejudices of their homeland. In July 2015 the same journal that published Jensen's 2002 paper published a rebuttal by Rebecca A. Fried, an 8th-grade student at Sidwell Friends School. She listed multiple instances of the restriction used in advertisements for many different types of positions, including "clerks at stores and hotels, bartenders, farm workers, house painters, hog butchers, coachmen, bookkeepers, blackers, workers at lumber yards, upholsterers, bakers, gilders, tailors, and papier mache workers, among others."  While the greatest number of NINA instances occurred in the 1840s, Fried found instances for its continued use throughout the subsequent century, with the most recent dating to 1909 in Butte, Montana.

Alongside "No Irish Need Apply" signs, in the post-World War II years, signs saying "No Irish, No Blacks, No Dogs" or similar anti-Irish sentiment are reported to begin to appear in the United Kingdom.

20th century

In July 1905 the British Parliament attempted to introduce the Drunkenness (Ireland) Bill which aimed to provide financial protection to the spouses of "habitual drunkards" and set penalties for adults who were found to be drunk while caring for children. The Irish Nationalist MP for South Louth, Joseph Nolan, said that the "very title 'Drunkenness (Ireland) Bill' was offensive" and that he "resented any special measure of this kind being brought forward to deal with drunkenness in Ireland which was not applicable to Great Britain as well."

According to a 2004 report by the Irish Department of Foreign Affairs, Irish soldiers serving in the British Expeditionary Force (BEF) during World War I were treated more harshly in courts-martial because "British military courts were anti-Irish".

The American writer H. P. Lovecraft held very anti-Irish views. In 1921, concerning the possibility of an independent Irish state, he said the following: "If the Irish had the ‘right’ to independence they would possess it.  If they ever gain it, they will possess it – until they lose it again.  England has the right to rule because she does... It is not chance, but racial superiority, which has made the Briton supreme.  Why have not the Irish conquered and colonized the earth if they be so deserving of regard?  They are brainless canaille."

In 1923, the General Assembly of the Church of Scotland approved a report entitled The Menace of the Irish race to our Scottish Nationality, which called for "means to be found to preserve Scotland and the Scottish race and to secure in future generations the traditions, ideals and faith of a great people, unspoiled and inviolate."

In 1934, writer J. B. Priestley published the travelogue English Journey, in which he wrote "A great many speeches have been made and books written on the subject of what England has done to Ireland... I should be interested to hear a speech and read a book or two on the subject of what Ireland has done to England... if we do have an Irish Republic as our neighbour, and it is found possible to return her exiled citizens, what a grand clearance there will be in all the western ports, from the Clyde to Cardiff, what a fine exit of ignorance and dirt and drunkenness and disease."

21st century
In 2002, English journalist Julie Burchill narrowly escaped prosecution for incitement to racial hatred, following a column in The Guardian where she described Ireland as being synonymous with "child molestation, Nazi-sympathising, and the oppression of women". She had expressed anti-Irish sentiment several times throughout her career, announcing in the London journal Time Out, "I hate the Irish, I think they're appalling."

In 2012, The Irish Times published a report on anti-Irish prejudice in Britain. It claimed that far-right British nationalist groups continued to use "anti-IRA" marches as "an excuse to attack and intimidate Irish immigrants". Shortly before the 2012 Summer Olympics, British athlete Daley Thompson was shown an image of a runner with a misspelt tattoo and said that the person responsible for the misspelling "must have been Irish". The BBC issued an apology.

In March 2012, a classified ad in Perth placed by a bricklayer stated that "no Irish" should apply for the job.

On 8 August 2012, an article appeared in Australian newspapers titled "Punch Drunk: Ireland intoxicated as Taylor swings towards boxing gold". The article claimed that Katie Taylor was not "what you'd expect in a fighting Irishwoman, nor is she surrounded by people who'd prefer a punch to a potato". The journalist who wrote it apologised for "indulging racial stereotypes". The following day, Australian commentator Russell Barwick asserted that athletes from Ireland should compete for the British Olympic team, likening it to surfer from Hawaii "not surfing for the USA". When fellow presenter Mark Chapman explained that the Republic of Ireland was an independent state, Barwick remarked, "It's nothing but an Irish joke."

Since at least 2012, Greg Hodge, managing director of the dating website BeautifulPeople.com, has expressed anti-Irish sentiment on numerous occasions. In 2020, he said, "There are many examples of very handsome Irish men in Hollywood. However this is the exception and not the norm. Irish men are the undisputed ugliest in the world. They really are in a league of their own." His comments are often mocked.

On 25 June 2013, an Irish flag was burned at an Orange Order headquarters in the Everton area of Liverpool. This was seen by members of Liverpool's Irish community, which is the biggest in the UK, as a hate crime.

In December 2014, British broadcaster Channel 4 caused an "outrage" and "fury" in Ireland and the UK when it planned a comedy series about the Irish Famine. The sitcom named Hungry, was announced by writer Hugh Travers, who said "we’re kind of thinking of it as Shameless in famine Ireland." The response in Ireland was quick and negative: "Jewish people would never endorse making a comedy of the mass extermination of their ancestors at the hands of the Nazis, Cambodians would never support people laughing at what happened to their people at the hands of the Khmer Rouge and the people of Somalia, Ethiopia or Sudan would never accept the plight of their people, through generational famine, being the source of humour in Britain," Dublin councillor David McGuinness said. "I am not surprised that it is a British television outlet funding this venture." The writer defended the concept saying, "Comedy equals tragedy plus time." Channel 4 issued a press release stating that "This in the development process and is not currently planned to air... It's not unusual for sitcoms to exist against backdrops that are full of adversity and hardship". Protesters from the Irish community planned to picket the offices of Channel 4 and campaigners called the proposed show 'institutionalised anti-Irish racism'.

In January 2019, American rapper Azealia Banks made disparaging comments on Instagram about Irish people after getting into an argument with a flight attendant on an Aer Lingus flight to Dublin. She called Irish people "a bunch of prideful inbred leprechauns" and "barbarians". The following day, she said she would dedicate her Dublin show to "beautiful Irish women". However, following the show, Banks again attacked the Irish online and mocked the Irish Famine.

In March 2021, the Equality and Human Rights Commission said it had investigated British holiday park operator Pontins after a whistleblower revealed that Pontins maintained a blacklist of common Irish surnames to prevent Irish Travellers from entering its parks.

Northern Ireland
Since the formation of Northern Ireland in 1921, there have been tensions between Protestants, who tend to refer to themselves as British, and Catholics, who tend to refer to themselves as Irish.

In 1988, John Taylor, the Ulster Unionist MP for Strangford, replied to a letter from Gearoid Ó Muilleoir, deputy president of the Student's Union in Queen's University Belfast, relating to grants for students in Northern Ireland. Taylor's letter said, "Since your surname is clearly unpronounceable I have, rightly or wrongly, concluded that you are Irish and not British. I therefore suggest that you, and those whom you represent, apply for any necessary grants to the Dublin Government."

Taylor later repudiated being Irish in a debate in Dublin: "We in Northern Ireland are not Irish. We do not jig at crossroads, speak Gaelic, play GAA etc… It is an insult for Dubliners to refer to us as being Irish."

In 1999, Austin Currie, a former member of the SDLP from Dungannon, Co Tyrone, spoke in the Irish Parliament on the effect of partition on Catholics in Northern Ireland: "Partition was used to try to cut us off from the rest of the Irish nation. Unionists did their best to stamp out our nationalism and, the educational system, to the extent it could organise it, was oriented to Britain and we were not even allowed to use names such as Séamus or Seán. When my brothers' godparents went to register their birth, they were told no such names as Séamus or Seán existed in Northern Ireland and were asked for the English equivalent."

Since the Troubles began in the late 1960s, loyalists have consistently expressed anti-Irish sentiment. Irish tricolours have been burned on the yearly Eleventh Night bonfires. In August 1993 the Red Hand Commando announced that it would attack pubs or hotels where Irish folk music is played, although it withdrew the threat shortly after. In 2000, loyalists made posters and banners that read "The Ulster conflict is about nationality. IRISH OUT!".

The Provisional IRA's bombings in England led to fear and anti-Irish sentiment. After the Birmingham pub bombings, for example, there were reports of isolated attacks on Irish people and Irish-owned businesses in the Australian press. In the 1990s, writers for the Daily Mail newspaper "called for Irish people to be banned from UK sporting events and fined for IRA disruption to public transport", one of numerous opinions expressed over many years which has led the Daily Mail to be accused by some in Ireland of publishing "some of the most virulently anti-Irish journalism in Britain for decades".

Irish Traveller discrimination
Irish Travellers are an ethnic and cultural minority group, who have been present in Ireland for centuries, and whose members experience overt discrimination throughout Ireland and the United Kingdom. Such discrimination is similar in nature to antiziganism (prejudice against Romani people) in the United Kingdom and Europe. Anti-Traveller racism is similar to the form of racism which was experienced by the Irish during the diaspora of the 19th century, with media attack campaigns in the United Kingdom and Ireland using both national/local newspapers and radio. Irish Travellers in the Irish media have stated they are living in Ireland under an apartheid regime. In 2013, Irish journalist Jennifer O'Connell, writing in The Irish Times, wrote that "Our casual racism against Travellers is one of Ireland's last great shames". While there is a willingness to acknowledge that there is widespread prejudice towards Travellers in Irish society, and a recognition of discrimination against Travellers, there is still strong resistance among the Irish public to calling the treatment of Travellers racist.

Examples include the burning down of houses allocated to the Travellers by the state due to Traveller feuds. In 2013 a Traveller home in Ballyshannon, Co Donegal was destroyed by fire days before members of a Traveller family were due to move in. Local Councillor Pearse Doherty said the house was specifically targeted because it was to house a Traveller family and was destroyed due to a 'hatred of Travellers'. Another local Councillor Sean McEniff of Bundoran caused controversy and a complaint under the 'Incitement to Hatred Act' when he stated that, due to the house's initial purchase, Travellers "should live in isolation from the settled community." and "I would not like these people (the family) living beside me".

The British television series Big Fat Gypsy Weddings has been accused of bullying and an instigation of racial hatred against Irish Travellers in England. The series has faced a number of controversies, including allegations of racism in its advertising and instigating a rise in the rate of racially motivated bullying.

See also
 Anti-Catholicism
 Philadelphia Nativist Riots
 Sectarianism in Glasgow
 Stage Irish
 Stereotypes of Irish Americans
 White ethnic

Notes

References

Further reading
 Kennedy, Liam. Unhappy the Land: The Most Oppressed People Ever, the Irish? (Irish Academic Press, 2015); deals only with Ireland;  online review

 MacRaild, Donald. " 'No Irish need apply': the origins and persistence of a prejudice." Labour History Review 78.3 (2013): 269-299; in Britain

 MacRaild, Donald M. ..Faith, Fraternity and Fighting: The Orange Order and Irish Migrants in Northern England, C. 1850-1920.. (Liverpool University Press, 2005).

 MacRaild, Donald M. Culture, conflict, and migration: the Irish in Victorian Cumbria (Liverpool University Press, 1998).
 MacRaild, Donald M. "Transnationalising 'Anti‐Popery': Militant Protestant Preachers in the Nineteenth‐Century Anglo‐World." Journal of Religious History 39.2 (2015): 224-243. online

External links
 Irish Famine Unit II: Racism

 
Ireland
Sectarianism
Racism